Alstonia sebusii, synonym Alstonia henryi, is a species of flowering plant in the family  Apocynaceae, native to the region of Assam, south-central China, the east Himalayas and Myanmar. It was first described in 1871 as Blaberopus sebusii.

Conservation
Alstonia henryi was assessed as "vulnerable" in the 2004 IUCN Red List, where it is said to be native only to Yunnan, China. , A. henryi was regarded as a synonym of Alstonia sebusii, which has a wider distribution.

References

sebusii
Flora of Assam (region)
Flora of South-Central China
Flora of East Himalaya
Flora of Myanmar
Plants described in 1871